Tari Jordan Eason (born May 10, 2001) is an American professional basketball player for the Houston Rockets of the National Basketball Association (NBA). He played college basketball for the Cincinnati Bearcats and the LSU Tigers. Eason was selected 17th overall in the 2022 NBA draft by the Houston Rockets.

High school career
Eason started his high school career at Garfield High School in Seattle, Washington under head coach Brandon Roy, and played sparingly during his first two years. For his junior season, he transferred to Federal Way High School in Federal Way, Washington, where he played alongside top recruit Jaden McDaniels. Eason returned to Garfield for his senior season as Roy came back following a one-year break. He led his team to a 3A state title, recording 21 points and 14 rebounds against Paolo Banchero and O'Dea High School in the final, and received tournament MVP. Eason averaged 23 points, eight rebounds, and three steals per game as a senior, and was named 3A Player of the Year. A four-star recruit, he committed to playing college basketball for Cincinnati over offers from Colorado and USC.

College career
On February 26, 2021, Eason posted a freshman season-high 20 points, 13 rebounds, and three blocks in a 91–71 win over Tulane. As a freshman at Cincinnati, he averaged 7.3 points, 5.9 rebounds, 1.3 blocks, and 1.2 steals per game, earning American Athletic Conference All-Freshman Team honors. For his sophomore season, Eason transferred to LSU. He was named to the First Team All-SEC as well as SEC Sixth Man of the Year. Eason averaged 16.9 points, 6.6 rebounds, and 1.9 steals per game. On March 25, 2022, he declared for the 2022 NBA draft, forgoing his remaining college eligibility.

Professional career

Houston Rockets (2022–present) 
Eason was selected with the 17th overall pick by the Houston Rockets in the 2022 NBA draft. Eason joined the Rockets' 2022 NBA Summer League roster. In his Summer League debut, Eason tallied 14 points and 13 rebounds in a 77–91 win over the Orlando Magic. On July 18, 2022, Eason was named to the All-NBA Summer League First Team, averaging 17.2 points on 44.7 percent shooting from the field along with 1.8 steals and a block. On October 2, Eason made his preseason debut, scoring 21 points off the bench in addition to securing ten rebounds, two assists, two steals, and one block in a 134–96 win against the San Antonio Spurs.On October 19, 2022, he made his NBA debut with an eight-point and seven-rebound performance in a 117–107 loss to the Atlanta Hawks.

On February 1, 2023, Eason scored a career-high 20 points with 13 rebounds (12 of them being offensive rebounds) and three steals in only 19 minutes of play in a 112-106 win against the Oklahoma City Thunder.

Personal life 
Eason has three siblings: Tega, Angel, and Avante. While at LSU, he majored in interdiscplinary studies.

Career statistics

College

|-
| style="text-align:left;"| 2020–21
| style="text-align:left;"| Cincinnati
| 23 || 8 || 19.6 || .462 || .241 || .574 || 5.9 || 1.3 || 1.2 || 1.3 || 7.3
|-
| style="text-align:left;"| 2021–22
| style="text-align:left;"| LSU
| 33 || 4 || 24.4 || .521 || .359 || .803 || 6.6 || 1.0 || 1.9 || 1.1 || 16.9
|- class="sortbottom"
| style="text-align:center;" colspan="2"| Career
| 56 || 12 || 22.4 || .504 || .327 || .757 || 6.3 || 1.1 || 1.6 || 1.2 || 13.0

References

External links

LSU Tigers bio
Cincinnati Bearcats bio

2001 births
Living people
American men's basketball players
Basketball players from Seattle
Basketball players from Virginia
Cincinnati Bearcats men's basketball players
Garfield High School (Seattle) alumni
Houston Rockets draft picks
Houston Rockets players
LSU Tigers basketball players
Power forwards (basketball)
Sportspeople from Portsmouth, Virginia